The 1972 Baltimore International was a men's tennis tournament played on indoor carpet courts at the Towson State College in Baltimore, Maryland in the United States that was part of the 1972 USLTA Indoor Circuit. It was the inaugural edition of the event and was held from January 7 through January 9, 1972. Second-seeded Ilie Năstase won the singles title and earned $2,550 first-prize money.

Finals

Singles
 Ilie Năstase defeated  Jimmy Connors 1–6, 6–4, 7–6(5–1)
 It was Năstase's 1st singles title of the year and the 10th of his career.

Doubles
 Jimmy Connors /  Haroon Rahim defeated  Pierre Barthès /  Clark Graebner 6–3, 3–6, 6–3

References

External links
 ITF tournament edition details

Baltimore International
Baltimore International
Baltimore International